Instant Death is an album by American jazz saxophonist Eddie Harris recorded in 1971 and released on the Atlantic label.

Reception

The Allmusic review called the album "one of Eddie Harris's stronger Atlantic albums of the 1970s".

Track listing
All compositions by Eddie Harris except as indicated
 "Instant Death" - 5:46 
 "Little Wes" (Ronald Muldrow) - 7:30 
 "Zambezi Dance" (Harris, Muldrow, Muhal Richard Abrams, Master Henry Gibson, Billy James) - 4:09 
 "Summer's on Its Way" - 7:46 
 "Nightcap" - 5:08 
 "Superfluous" - 3:18 
 "Tampion" - 2:47

Personnel
Eddie Harris - tenor saxophone, varitone, reed trumpet, cowbell, shaker, horn vocals
Muhal Richard Abrams - electric piano, African whistle
Ronald Muldrow - electric guitar
Rufus Reid - bass, electric bass
Billy James - drums
Master Henry Gibson - congas, African talking drum

References 

Eddie Harris albums
1972 albums
Atlantic Records albums